Craveable Brands Ltd (formerly known as Quick Service Restaurant Holdings) is an Australian fast food holding company. It owns the Red Rooster, Oporto, and Chicken Treat brands with 580 restaurants in Australasia and Southeast Asia. The company has been a subsidiary of Hong Kong-based private equity firm PAG Asia Capital since July 2019.

History 
The company was founded in 2007 as Quick Service Restaurant Holdings (QSR) from the management buyout of Australian Fast Foods (AFF). The A$180 million deal was in partnership with Quadrant Private Equity, AFF's managing director Frank Romano, and other management members.  

In July 2007, QSR acquired the Oporto chain of restaurants for A$60 million.  

In June 2011, Archer Capital acquired QSR from Quadrant Private Equity for an estimated A$450 million. 

In May 2017 the company was renamed from Quick Service Restaurant Holdings to Craveable Brands Ltd in advance of a proposed stock market flotation. In July 2019, parent company Archer Capital sold Craveable Brands to PAG Asia Capital for an estimated A$450–500 million.

References

Food and drink companies based in Sydney

Fast-food chains of Australia
Fast-food franchises
Holding companies of Australia
Restaurant chains in Australia